The crossbill is a genus, Loxia, of birds in the finch family (Fringillidae), with six species. These birds are characterised by the mandibles with crossed tips, which gives the group its English name. Adult males tend to be red or orange in colour, and females green or yellow, but there is much variation.

Crossbills are specialist feeders on conifer cones, and the unusual bill shape is an adaptation which enables them to extract seeds from cones. These birds are typically found in higher northern hemisphere latitudes, where their food sources grow. They irrupt out of the breeding range when the cone crop fails. Crossbills breed very early in the year, often in winter months, to take advantage of maximum cone supplies.

Systematics and evolution
The genus Loxia was introduced by the Swedish naturalist Carl Linnaeus in 1758 in the 10th edition of his Systema Naturae. The name is from the Ancient Greek , "crosswise". The Swiss naturalist Conrad Gessner had used the word Loxia for a crossbill in 1555 in his Historiae Animalium. The type species was designated as Loxia curvirostra (red crossbill) by George Robert Gray in 1840.

Analysis of mitochondrial cytochrome b sequence data indicates that the crossbills and redpolls share a common ancestor and only diverged during the Tortonian (Late Miocene).  The research suggests that the genera Loxia and Carduelis might be merged into a single genus, for which the name Loxia would then have priority. But this would imply changing the name of a large number of species, and given that the adaptations of the crossbills represent a unique evolutionary path (see Evolutionary grade), it seems more appropriate to split up the genus Carduelis as it had already been done during most of the 20th century. Unfortunately, the fossil record is restricted to a Late Pliocene species, Loxia patevi, found at Varshets, Bulgaria.

The species of crossbills are difficult to separate, and care is needed even with the two-barred and Hispaniolan crossbills, the easiest. The other species are identified by subtle differences in head shape and bill size, and the identification problems formerly led to much taxonomic speculation, with some scientists considering that the parrot and Scottish crossbills and possibly the Hispaniolan and two-barred crossbills are conspecific.

The identification problem is least severe in North America, where only the red and white-winged species occur, and (possibly) worst in the Scottish Highlands, where three species breed and the two-barred is also a possible vagrant.

Work on vocalization in North America suggests that there are eight or nine discrete populations of red crossbill in that continent alone, which do not interbreed and are (like the named species) adapted to specialise in different conifer species. While several ornithologists seem inclined to give these forms species status, no division of the American red crossbills has yet occurred. Preliminary investigations in Europe and Asia suggest an equal, if not greater, complexity, with several different call types identified; these call types being as different from each other as from the named species of the parrot and Scottish crossbills - suggesting either that they are valid species, or else that the parrot and Scottish crossbills may not be.

Genetic research on their DNA failed to reveal any difference between any of the crossbills (including the morphologically distinct two-barred), with variation between individuals greater than any difference between the taxa. This led to the suggestion that limited interbreeding between the different types prevented significant genetic differentiation, and enabled each type to maintain a degree of morphological plasticity, which may be necessary to enable them to feed on different conifers when their preferred food species has a crop failure. Research in Scotland, however, has shown that the parrot and Scottish crossbills are reproductively isolated from each other and also from the red crossbill, despite irruption of that species into their ranges, and the diagnostic calls and bill dimensions have not been lost. They are, therefore, good species.

Currently accepted species and their preferred food sources are:

Originally, the chestnut-backed sparrow-lark (Eremopterix leucotis) was also classified as belonging within the genus Loxia.

Feeding behavior

The different species specialise in feeding on different conifer species, with the bill shape optimised for opening that species of conifer. This is achieved by inserting the bill between the conifer cone scales and twisting the lower mandible towards the side to which it crosses, enabling the bird to extract the seed at the bottom of the scale with its tongue.

The mechanism by which the bill-crossing (which usually, but not always, occurs in a 1:1 frequency of left-crossing or right-crossing morphs) is developed, and what determines the direction has hitherto withstood all attempts to resolve it.

It is very probable that there is a genetic basis underlying the phenomenon (young birds whose bills are still straight will give a cone-opening behavior if their bills are gently pressed, and the crossing develops before the birds are fledged and feeding independently), but at least in the red crossbill (the only species which has been somewhat thoroughly researched regarding this question) there is no straightforward mechanism of heritability.

While the direction of crossing seems to be the result of at least three genetic factors working together in a case of epistasis and most probably autosomal, it is not clear whether the 1:1 frequency of both morphs in most cases is the result of genetics or environmental selection. Populations that feed on cones without removing or twisting them will likely show a 1:1 morph distribution, no matter what the genetic basis may be: the fitness of each morph is inversely proportional to its frequency in the population. Such birds can only access the cone with the lower mandible tip pointing towards it to successfully extract seeds, and thus a too high number of birds of one morph will result in the food availability for each bird of this morph decreasing.

They can utilise other conifers to their preferred, and often need to do so when their preferred species has a crop failure, but are less efficient in their feeding (not enough to prevent survival, but probably enough to reduce breeding success).

Fossil record 
Loxia patevi was described from the late Pliocene of Varshets, Bulgaria.

References

External links
Crossbill videos, photos and sounds on the Internet Bird Collection

Extant Tortonian first appearances